Parallel Mothers is a 2021 Spanish drama film written and directed by Pedro Almodóvar. The film stars Penélope Cruz and Milena Smit and features Aitana Sánchez-Gijón, Israel Elejalde, Julieta Serrano and Rossy de Palma.

The film had its premiere as the opening film of the 78th Venice International Film Festival on 1 September 2021 where Cruz was awarded the Volpi Cup for Best Actress. It was released theatrically in Spain on 8 October 2021 by Sony Pictures Releasing International. It was also the closing film of the 2021 New York Film Festival on the same day. The film earned two nominations at the 94th Academy Awards for Best Actress (Cruz) and Best Original Score (Iglesias).

Plot
Photographer Janis Martínez does a photo shoot with renowned forensic archaeologist Arturo. She asks him if his foundation will help excavate a mass grave in her home village, where her great-grandfather and other men from the village were killed and buried during the Spanish Civil War. Arturo agrees to review the case with his foundation; he and Janis then sleep together and Janis becomes pregnant. She decides to keep the baby and raise it alone, against Arturo's wishes, whose wife is undergoing chemotherapy, but who wants to be with Janis.

Janis later shares a hospital room with Ana, a teen single mother; they give birth at the same time. After both babies are held for evaluation, they are released, and Janis and Ana go their separate ways. Janis and Ana stay in touch, keeping one another updated on their babies' progress. Arturo arrives one day asking to see baby Cecilia; he reacts strangely, confessing that he does not believe the baby is his. Janis does a maternity test, which reveals that she is not Cecilia's biological mother, but she decides not to tell anyone.

Months later, Janis runs into Ana working at a cafe near her home; Ana has left her mother's home to fend for herself after her mother left to pursue acting on the road. Janis invites Ana up to her apartment, where Ana tearfully reveals that her baby Anita has suffered a crib death. Janis asks for a photo of Anita, which confirms her suspicions that their babies were swapped in the hospital.

Janis later offers Ana a job as a live-in maid, watching over the house and baby Cecilia. She collects saliva samples from the two of them without telling Ana they are for a maternity test, the results of which confirm that Cecilia is Ana's daughter. Ana later reveals that her pregnancy was the result of a gang rape by her classmates, and her father pressured her into staying silent to avoid negative press attention. The budding relationship between Janis and Ana further develops into a casual sexual relationship, but Janis is unable to commit fully to Ana who wants more from her.

Arturo arrives with news that his foundation has approved the excavation of the mass grave, and also that his wife has recovered from cancer and they are separating. He and Janis celebrate with a night out on the town, making Ana jealous. Ana's mother also comes by to reconnect with Ana, admitting to Janis that she feels like a terrible mother, but that she wanted so badly to pursue her dream as an actress.

Janis finally admits the truth to Ana, who reacts angrily and leaves in the night with Cecilia, to Janis' dismay. She calls Arturo and breaks the news to him as well; he spends the night with her, as they console each other. The next morning, Ana calls Janis, having calmed down, and says that Janis is still welcome to see Cecilia and be a part of her life.

Months later, Janis and Arturo travel to her home village, where he gathers information about the grave from surviving relatives and prepares for the excavation with his team. Ana later arrives with Cecilia, Janis revealing to her that she is three months pregnant. When asked what she will name the baby, Janis says Ana if it is a girl and Antonio if it is a boy (after her great-grandfather). The excavation is a success, the village gathering at the exhumed grave to mourn their lost loved ones.

Cast

Production
In February 2021 it was announced that Pedro Almodóvar was ready to direct his new film entitled Madres paralelas, with a cast headed by Penélope Cruz, Israel Elejalde, Julieta Serrano and Rossy de Palma. On 12 March 2021, it was reported that Pedro Almodóvar intended to integrate Anya Taylor-Joy into the main cast of the film.

Principal photography began on 12 March 2021 in Madrid, Spain, and concluded on 22 April 2021. Shooting locations included Madrid, Torrelaguna and Torremocha de Jarama. Produced by El Deseo and Remotamente Films AIE with the support of RTVE and Netflix, the movie also received funding from the ICAA.

Release
On 4 February 2021, Pathé acquired the UK distribution rights to the film. On 23 April 2021, Sony Pictures Classics acquired the North American, Australian and New Zealand distribution rights to the film. The film had its world premiere at the 78th Venice International Film Festival on 1 September 2021. Distributed by Sony Pictures Entertainment Iberia, it was intended to be theatrically released in Spain on 10 September 2021 but was postponed to 8 October. It was released in the United States on 24 December 2021. It was released theatrically in the United Kingdom on 28 January 2022, and was the first film released under Pathé's new term deal with Warner Bros. Pictures along with The Duke, after their distribution agreement with Disney expired on 30 June 2021.

Its theatrical release poster, featuring a lactating nipple, was removed from Instagram due to its rules regarding nudity. The decision was criticized by the "free the nipple" movement, leading to an apology from Instagram.

Netflix acquired the exclusive distribution rights for the Latin-American region, aiming for an early 2022 release, even if theatrical openings were not ruled out at the time of the announcement. A theatrical window of 15 days prior to streaming was the choice for Argentina, with the "in a few theatres" was released on 3 February 2022.

Reception

At its opening night world premiere, the movie received a nine-minute standing ovation from Venice Film Festival attendees in the Sala Grande. It was submitted to be the Spanish entry to the 94th Academy Awards alongside Mediterraneo: The Law of the Sea and The Good Boss, but the latter film was the final official selection.

Accolades

See also
 List of Spanish films of 2021

References

External links
 

2021 films
2021 drama films
2021 LGBT-related films
2020s female buddy films
2020s Spanish films
2020s Spanish-language films
El Deseo films
Female bisexuality in film
Films about mother–daughter relationships
Films about photographers
Films directed by Pedro Almodóvar
Films scored by Alberto Iglesias
Films set in Madrid
Films shot in Madrid
LGBT-related drama films
Sony Pictures Classics films
Spanish drama films
Spanish LGBT-related films